Bacho is the northernmost district (amphoe) of Narathiwat province, southern Thailand.

History
In 1908 the district was established as the minor district (king amphoe) Champako (จำปากอ), which was upgraded to a full district the following year. In 1917 the district was renamed Bacho.

The district was part of Sai Buri Province, which was abolished in 1932. While Sai Buri District came to Pattani Province, Bacho was added to Narathiwat.

Geography
Neighboring districts are (from the east clockwise) Mueang Narathiwat, Yi-ngo, and Rueso of Narathiwat Province, Raman of Yala province, and Kapho, Sai Buri, and Mai Kaen of Pattani province.

Budo–Su-ngai Padi National Park is in the mountains at the border of Yala and Pattani.

Administration

Central administration 
Bacho district is divided into six sub-districts (tambons), which are further subdivided into 46 administrative villages (mubans).

Local administration 
There are two sub-district municipalities (thesaban tambons) in the district:
 Ton Sai consisting of parts of sub-district Paluka Samo.
 Bacho consisting of parts of sub-district Bacho.

There are six sub-district administrative organizations (SAO) in the district:
 Bacho consisting of parts of sub-district Bacho.
 Lubo Sawo consisting of sub-district Lubo Sawo.
 Kayo Mati consisting of sub-district Kayo Mati.
 Paluka Samo consisting of parts of sub-district Paluka Samo.
 Bare Nuea consisting of sub-district Bare Nuea.
 Bare Tai consisting of sub-district Bare Tai.

References

External links
 amphoe.com
 Budo - Su-ngai Padi National Park 

Districts of Narathiwat province